Noria Manouchi (born 1991) is a Swedish politician from the Moderate Party. Since the 2018 general election, she has served as Member of the Riksdag representing the constituency of Malmö.

She was also elected as Member of the Riksdag in September 2022.

References 

1991 births
Living people
21st-century Swedish women politicians
21st-century Swedish politicians
People from Malmö Municipality
Women members of the Riksdag
Members of the Riksdag from the Moderate Party
Members of the Riksdag 2018–2022
Members of the Riksdag 2022–2026